Building Enclosure Commissioning (BECx) (sometimes 'envelope' is used instead of 'enclosure') is a strict quality-focused process wherein the energy performance of a facility, system or assembly is evaluated and verified against defined objectives and criteria. The process itself is carried out by a commissioning team which uses reliable and accurate measures to verify that the project is meeting specific quality requirements outlined by the owner of the project. The commissioning process begins at project inception and runs through different construction phases, which include a pre-design phase, pre-construction phase and construction phase. Once the construction is finished, the commissioning process continues and becomes an ongoing routine in the life of the facility. Specific information regarding the commissioning process is outlined in the ASHRAE Guideline 0-2005: The Commissioning Process. This and several other technical support guidelines to the Guideline 0-2005 document provide specific information related to the commissioning process.

Typical Commissioning Objectives:
 Heat Flow
 Air Flow
 Noise
 Fire
 Light
 Infrared
 Ultraviolet
 Rain Penetration
 Moisture
 structural performance
 Durability
 Security
 Reliability
 Aesthetics
 Value
 Constructability
 Maintainability
 Sustainability

See also

 Building envelope
 Building services engineering
 National Institute of Building Sciences

References
WBDG.org. "GUIDELINE 3-2006 EXTERIOR ENCLOSURE TECHNICAL REQUIREMENTS FOR THE COMMISSIONING PROCESS". 2006. p. 1
 ASTM E2813, Standard Practice for Building Enclosure Commissioning;
 ASTM E2947, Standard Guide for Building Enclosure Commissioning (Not yet published.  This standard is scheduled to replace NIBS Guideline 3-2006 and 2012 upon publication);
 ASHRAE Standard 202, Commissioning Process for Buildings and Systems

External links
 How The Commissioning Process Is Applied To Building Envelopes
 What is BECx?
 Kenter, Peter "Commissioning boosts building envelope performance"

Energy policy of the United States